The 1996 NCAA Women's Gymnastics championship involved 12 schools competing for the national championship of women's NCAA Division I gymnastics.  It was the fifteenth NCAA gymnastics national championship and the defending NCAA Team Champion for 1995 was Utah.  The competition took place in Tuscaloosa, Alabama, hosted by the University of Alabama in the Coleman Coliseum. The 1996 Championship was won by host, Alabama and was their 3rd NCAA Title, setting a new NCAA record score of 198.025.

Team Results

Session 1

Session 2

Super Six

External links
  Gym Results

NCAA Women's Gymnastics championship
NCAA Women's Gymnastics Championship